Yahya Toor (born 20 January 1962) is a Pakistani former cricketer. He played 72 first-class and 70 List A matches for several domestic teams in Pakistan between 1976 and 1994.

See also
 List of Pakistan Automobiles Corporation cricketers

References

External links
 

1962 births
Living people
Pakistani cricketers
Karachi cricketers
Pakistan Automobiles Corporation cricketers
Pakistan International Airlines cricketers
Cricketers from Karachi